Belshaw is a Site of Special Scientific Interest (SSSI)  in Lincolnshire, England. It lies to the west of the village of Belton in the Isle of Axholme. The site, which was designated a SSSI in 1988, is a short length of land along a disused railway line and is important because it supports a colony of greater yellow-rattle. This is a nationally rare plant which receives special protection under Schedule 8 of the Wildlife and Countryside Act, 1981. Once widely distributed, this species is now known to occur at only six localities in Great Britain.

References 

Sites of Special Scientific Interest in Lincolnshire